German submarine U-1105, a Type VII-C/41 U-boat of Nazi Germany's Kriegsmarine, was built at the Nordseewerke Shipyard, Emden, Germany, and commissioned on 3 June 1944. Oberleutnant zur See Hans-Joachim Schwarz was given command. He would command U-1105 for the remainder of the war.

Design
German Type VIIC/41 submarines were preceded by the heavier Type VIIC submarines. U-1105 had a displacement of  when at the surface and  while submerged. She had two shafts and two  propellers.

U-1105 was fitted with five  torpedo tubes (four fitted at the bow and one at the stern), fourteen torpedoes, one  SK C/35 naval gun, 220 rounds, and an anti-aircraft gun. The boat had a complement of between forty-four and sixty.

Armament

FLAK weaponry
U-1105 was mounted with a single 3.7 cm Flakzwilling M43U gun on the LM 42U mount. The LM 42U mount was the most common mount used with the 3.7 cm Flak M42U. The 3.7 cm Flak M42U was the marine version of the 3.7 cm Flak used by the Kriegsmarine on Type VII and Type IX U-boats. U-1105 was mounted with two 2cm Flak C38 in a M 43U Zwilling mount with short folding shield on the upper Wintergarten. The M 43U mount was used on a number of U-boats (and ).

Sensors

Passive sonar
U-1105 was one of only ten Type VIIC's to be fitted with a Balkongerät (literally 'Balcony apparatus or equipment'). The Balkongerät was used on U-boats (and ). The Balkongerät was standard on the Type XXI and the Type XXIII. Nonetheless, it was also fitted to several Type IXs and one Type X. The Balkongerät was an improved version of Gruppenhorchgerät (GHG) (group listening device). The GHG had 24 hydrophones, the Balkongerät had 48 hydrophones and improved electronics, which enabled more accurate readings to be taken.

Service history

Kriegsmarine
It was one of less than ten submarines that the Germans outfitted with experimental synthetic rubber skin of anechoic tiles designed to counter Allied sonar devices. Codenamed "Alberich," after a sorcerer from ancient Norse mythology, this top-secret rubber coating process ultimately contributed to the ship's survival under extreme combat conditions and earned it the name "Black Panther." For this reason, a black panther sprawled across the top of the globe was painted on U-1105's conning tower.

After trials in the Baltic Sea and final outfitting in Wilhelmshaven, the submarine began patrolling Allied convoy routes near Blackrock, Ireland in the spring of 1945. In April, U-1105 escaped detection by an Allied destroyer patrol. Days later, the U-boat detected three British destroyers that were part of the Second Division of the 21st Escort Group. The submarine fired two acoustic torpedoes at a range of 2000 meters and then dove to 100 meters to escape a counterattack. Fifty seconds passed before the first torpedo struck, with the second hitting just moments later. Thirty-two crewmen from U-1105's victim, were lost. The Allied search for U-1105 and the search for Redmill's survivors began immediately. The submarine, unable to maintain its 330-foot depth, sank to the bottom at 570 feet, remaining motionless. For the next 31 hours, the Allied squadron searched for the U-boat without success. U-1105 evaded detection for the remainder of World War II.

On 4 May 1945, U-1105 received the last order from Großadmiral Karl Dönitz: the war is over. Ironically, the submarine surrendered to the 21st Escort Group, the same escort group it attacked just a few weeks earlier. Ordered to the surface and intercepted by the Sunderland "NS-V" of No. 201 Squadron RAF which then escorted it, the submarine proceeded to the Allied base at Loch Eriboll, Scotland on 10 May 1945 to surrender.

Royal Navy
Though still operated by her German crew, U-1105 was re-designated as the Royal Navy submarine N-16 and sailed under armed frigate and air escort along with other surrendered U-boats, through the North Minch to the British naval base at Lochalsh, then to Lisahally, Northern Ireland. Given a British caretaker crew she sat at Lisshally for several months before she was turned over to the United States as a war prize for study of its unique synthetic rubber skin.

United States Navy
In 1946, re-designated U-1105, the U-boat arrived in Portsmouth, New Hampshire. The Naval Research Laboratory in Washington, D.C., and Massachusetts Institute of Technology's Acoustic Laboratory in Cambridge, Massachusetts, conducted research on its unique rubber-tiled skin. After the research was completed, the boat was towed to Solomon's Island, Maryland for explosives testing.

Salvage and towing tests were conducted from 10 to 25 August 1946. Moored on 29 September 1946 to allow pontoons to be fixed to her sides, U-1105 underwent another series of salvage and towing tests until 18 November 1946, when she was sunk off Point No Point Light, Maryland and buoys were left to mark the spot.

In the summer of 1949 U-1105 was raised again, towed into the Potomac River and anchored off Piney Point, Maryland, for preparations for her final demolition. On 19 September 1949, a  MK.6 depth charge was detonated  from U-1105. Little evidence was left to mark the wreck, so for the next 36 years the submarine was lost to history.

The wreck
In November 1994, it was designated as Maryland's first historic shipwreck preserve. The program, the first of its kind in the state, was designed to promote the preservation of historic shipwreck sites while making them accessible to the general public.

At the wreck site, the conning tower rises to within 68 feet of the surface. The wood covered main deck fore and aft of the conning tower is occasionally exposed by the drifting silt beds. The wreck is well preserved, and largely intact. Seasonally, thick layers of marine growth appear and then disappear on the site, often covering structural features.

The site is maintained for the Maryland Historical Trust by the Institute of Maritime History, and was placed on the National Register of Historic Places in 2001.

Summary of raiding history

References

Notes

Citations

Bibliography

External links

history.navy.mil: U-1105 
Maryland Historical Trust U-1105
, including undated photo, at Maryland Historical Trust
Institute of Maritime History Site

German Type VIIC/41 submarines
Ships built in Emden
1944 ships
U-boats commissioned in 1944
Captured U-boats
World War II submarines of Germany
Submarines of the Royal Navy
Submarines of the United States Navy
Research submarines of the United States
Ships sunk as targets
Maritime incidents in 1948
Maritime incidents in 1949
Shipwrecks of the Maryland coast
Shipwrecks on the National Register of Historic Places in Maryland
World War II on the National Register of Historic Places
National Register of Historic Places in St. Mary's County, Maryland